Ahmed or Ahmed Karamanli or Qaramanli or al-Qaramanli, (most commonly Ahmed Karamanli) (1686–1745) was of Janissary origin and a Member from the Karamanids. He founded the Karamanli dynasty (1711–1835) of Tripolitania or Tripoli (in present-day Libya). He reigned (1711–1745), as the first Karamanli Pasha of Tripolitania.

In the early 18th century, the Ottoman Empire was losing its grip on its North African holdings, including Tripoli. A period of civil war ensued, with no ruler able to hold office for more than a year. Ahmed Karamanli, a Janissary and popular cavalry officer, murdered the Ottoman governor and seized the throne in the 1711 Karamanli coup. After persuading the Ottomans to recognize him as governor, Ahmed established himself as pasha and made his post hereditary. Though Tripoli continued to pay nominal tribute to the Ottoman padishah, it acted otherwise as an independent kingdom.

An intelligent and able man, Ahmed greatly expanded his city's economy, particularly through the employment of corsairs on crucial Mediterranean shipping routes.  Nations that wished to protect their ships from the corsairs were forced to pay tribute to the pasha. On land, Ahmed expanded Tripoli's control as far as Fezzan and Cyrenaica before his death in 1745.

Ahmed's successors proved less capable rulers, however, and the kingdom was soon wracked by internal strife.  The Karamanli dynasty would end a century later as the Ottomans retook control.

See also
1711 Karamanli coup

References

McLachlan, K. S.  "Tripoli and Tripolitania: Conflict and Cohesion during the Period of the Barbary Corsairs (1551-1850)".  Transactions of the Institute of British Geographers, New Series 3.3 (1978): 285–294.
 Nora Lafi. "Une villed du Maghreb entre ancien régime et réformes ottomanes"; Tripoli 1795–1911, Paris, 2002

External links
US Country Studies: Karamanlis
Worldstatesmen.org's History and list of rulers of Tripolitania
Hostkingdom.net's History and list of rulers of Tripolitania

1686 births
1745 deaths
Ahmed Karamanli
Turkic rulers
Ottoman Tripolitania
Greek slaves from the Ottoman Empire
Libyan people of Turkish descent